Cardinal Ritter High School is a private, Roman Catholic high school on West 30th Street in Indianapolis, Indiana.  It is part of the Roman Catholic Archdiocese of Indianapolis.  It was founded in 1964 and serves the west side of the Indianapolis metropolitan area.

History
Cardinal Ritter High School opened in 1964 and was named after Cardinal Joseph E. Ritter who became the seventh Bishop and first archbishop of Indianapolis. Cardinal Joseph E. Ritter was born in 1892, was ordained in 1917, and became known for his work in desegregation. In 1938, he ordered all of the Catholic schools in the diocese to integrate, sixteen years before Brown v. Board of Education. He was appointed the first Archbishop of Indianapolis in 1944, and two years later was appointed Archbishop of St. Louis.

Community involvement
In 2008, service to the west side expanded to include the new "Rittertown" initiative. Through "Rittertown", Cardinal Ritter High School expanded its Service Learning Program beyond the campus boundaries and into the community surrounding the school. The entire Cardinal Ritter High School family came together with the Mayor of Indianapolis, the Indianapolis Colts, and the City of Indianapolis' Peace in the Streets - Stop the Violence campaign. The idea of "Rittertown" is to make this community a better place for its residents to live. It also elevate the legacy of Cardinal Joseph Ritter to its proper place. The students help to make this a reality with service projects in the community. Those projects include: beautification projects in area parks, visits with the elderly at local nursing homes, and English as a Second Language classes for adults in the area. "Rittertown" helps to continue to elevate the legacy of Cardinal Joseph Ritter in the city of Indianapolis.

In 2010; the Cardinal Ritter team won Brain Game; the next year they were runner-up.

Athletic championships
Football - 1977, 2003, 2008, 2013, 2016
Baseball - 2017

Notable alumni
John Andretti ('81) professional racecar driver
Devin Moore ('04) professional football player
Sarah Bacon ('15) Olympic Diver, 2020 Olympics

See also
 List of high schools in Indiana

References

External links
 Cardinal Ritter High School

Schools in Indianapolis
Catholic secondary schools in Indiana
Private high schools in Indiana
Roman Catholic Archdiocese of Indianapolis
Educational institutions established in 1964
Private middle schools in Indiana
1964 establishments in Indiana